The Humboldt Botanical Gardens is a 44.5 acres (18 ha) botanical garden located south of Eureka, California, United States. The Gardens are near the South Bay portion of Humboldt Bay on the north side of the College of the Redwoods. Grading and site preparation for the Gardens began in August 2003. The garden opened in 2006, with more development completed by 2008. 

The Humboldt Botanical Gardens offices are located in downtown Eureka and are operated by the nonprofit Humboldt Botanical Garden Foundation which had over 1000 members in 2020.

The Gardens were first organized in 1991. The area's climate, which straddles Mediterranean and Pacific Marine allows for a diverse group of plants. Its Lost Coast Brewery Native Plant Garden has an emphasis on the Humboldt region, but includes plants in the geographic area from the Rogue River to the north shore of San Francisco Bay, and inland to a north–south line running from Vacaville through Williams, Redding, Yreka, Medford, and along the Rogue River to its mouth. Other gardens are: “All Happy Now” earth sculpture, Riparian Area, Greenhouse, the Temperate Woodland Garden and the Ornamental Terrace Garden.

The Gardens are particularly interested in maintaining complete native conifer, Iris and Lilium occidental (western lily) collections.

See also
 List of botanical gardens in California

References

External links

 Official website

Botanical gardens in California
Eureka, California
Parks in Humboldt County, California
Tourist attractions in Eureka, California
2006 establishments in California